was a Japanese actor.

Career
Born in Kyoto Prefecture, Nitani attended Doshisha University but quit before graduating. He first worked as an announcer at Nagasaki Broadcasting Company, but in 1956 made his debut as an actor at Nikkatsu. Gaining the nickname "Dump Truck Guy" for his handsome, tough guy roles, he soon became a staple in Nikkatsu Action movies, often playing the second lead, but sometimes starring in his own films. He is probably best known abroad for his role in Seijun Suzuki's Tokyo Drifter. Nitani left Nikkatsu in 1971 and moved to television, where he starred in the Tokusō Saizensen police detective series, which ran for ten years between 1977 and 1987.

Nitani married the actress Yumi Shirakawa and their daughter, Yurie Nitani, is also an actress. He died of pneumonia on 7 January 2012, three weeks before his 82nd birthday.

Selected filmography

Film
 I Am Waiting (1957)
 Sun in the Last Days of the Shogunate (1957)
 Underworld Beauty (1958)
 Voice Without a Shadow (1958)
 Kurenai no Tsubasa (1958)
 Young Breasts (1958)
 My Second Brother (1959)
 Kenju burai-chō Denkō Setsuka no Otoko (1960)
 Man with a Shotgun (1961)
 Red Handkerchief (1964)
 Asia-Pol Secret Service (1966)
 Tokyo Drifter (1966)
 Massacre Gun (1967)
 Yogiri yo Kon'yamo Arigatō (1967)
 Retaliation (1968)
 The Sands of Kurobe (1968) as Odagiri
 Men and War (1970)
 Gang Warfare (1972)
 Submersion of Japan (1973)
 Karei-naru Ichizoku  (1974)
 Sakura no Kinoshita de (1989)

Television
 Mighty Jack (1968)
 Tokusō Saizensen (特捜最前線) (1977–1987)
 Nobunaga: King of Zipangu (1992), as Hirate Masahide

References

External links
 
  

Japanese male actors
1930 births
2012 deaths
People from Kyoto Prefecture
Doshisha University alumni
Deaths from pneumonia in Japan